The House of Droste zu Vischering is the name of an old and important Westphalian noble family in the Prince-Bishopric of Münster.

Notable family members 
 Bishop Clemens August Droste zu Vischering (1773–1845), Archbishop of Cologne
 Mary of the Divine Heart (Maria Droste zu Vischering, 1863–1899), Catholic nun
 Gottfried von Droste zu Vischering-Padberg (1908–1992), Physical chemist

See also 
 Erbdrostenhof in Münster, Westphalia
 Vischering Castle in Lüdinghausen, Münsterland
 Castle of Darfeld in Rosendahl, Münsterland

References

External links

German noble families
Political families of Germany
Surnames
Westphalian nobility